2013–14 Veria will compete in the following competitions  Super League Greece and Greek Cup.

Players

Squad information

Last updated: 13 January 2014 
Source: Squad at Veria FC official website

Transfers

Summer transfers

In:

Out:

Winter transfers

In:

Out:

Super League Greece

League table

Greek Cup

Player statistics

Goals

Last updated: 18 April 2014
Source:,

Assists

Last updated: 18 April 2014
Source:

References

Veria F.C. seasons
Veria F.C.